Hylastes is a genus of crenulate bark beetles in the family Curculionidae. There are more than 90 described species in Hylastes.

Species
These 91 species belong to the genus Hylastes:

 Hylastes alni Niisima, 1909
 Hylastes alternans Chapuis, 1869
 Hylastes ambiguus Blandford, 1894c
 Hylastes americanus Wickham & H.F., 1913
 Hylastes anatolicus Pfeffer (Knízek & Pfeffer in), 1994c
 Hylastes angustatus (Herbst & J.F.W., 1793)
 Hylastes angusticollis Eggers, 1929c
 Hylastes asper Swaine & J.M., 1917
 Hylastes asperatus Wood, 1975
 Hylastes ater Erichson, 1836
 Hylastes aterites Schedl, 1947
 Hylastes aterrimus Eggers
 Hylastes attenuatus Erichson, 1836
 Hylastes batnensis Brisout & C., 1883
 Hylastes bonvouloiri Chapuis, 1869
 Hylastes brunneus Erichson, 1836
 Hylastes canadensis Blackman, 1941
 Hylastes carbonarius Fitch, 1858
 Hylastes clavus Wollaston, 1854
 Hylastes contractus Chapuis, 1869
 Hylastes corticiperda Erichson, 1836
 Hylastes cristatus Mannerheim, 1853
 Hylastes criticus Eichhoff, 1868c
 Hylastes cunicularius Erichson, 1836
 Hylastes exilis Chapuis, 1869
 Hylastes fallax Wichmann & H.E., 1911a
 Hylastes flavicornis Lindberg & Har., 1950
 Hylastes flohri Wood, 1966b
 Hylastes fulgidus Blackman, 1941
 Hylastes gergeri Eggers, 1911a
 Hylastes gracilis LeConte, 1868
 Hylastes granosus Chapuis, 1869
 Hylastes granulatus LeConte, 1868
 Hylastes graphus Letzner (Duftschmidt in), 1891
 Hylastes himalabietis Beeson, 1961
 Hylastes himalayensis Stebbing & E.P., 1909
 Hylastes humilis Blanchard, 1851
 Hylastes imitator Reitter, 1900
 Hylastes incomptus Blandford, 1897a
 Hylastes interstitialis Chapuis, 1875
 Hylastes lifuanus Fauvel, 1872
 Hylastes linearis Erichson, 1836
 Hylastes longicollis Swaine, 1918
 Hylastes longifoliae Stebbing & E.P., 1908b
 Hylastes longipennis Blandford
 Hylastes longipilus Reitter, 1894a
 Hylastes longus Leconte, 1876
 Hylastes lowei Paiva, 1861b
 Hylastes macer LeConte, 1868 (root-feeding bark beetle)
 Hylastes mexicanus Wood, 1967
 Hylastes minutus Blackman, 1941
 Hylastes niger Wood, 1974a
 Hylastes nigrinus LeConte, 1868 (Douglas fir root bark beetle)
 Hylastes nitidus Swaine & J.M., 1917
 Hylastes obscurus Chapuis, 1875
 Hylastes opacus Erichson, 1836
 Hylastes parallelus Chapuis, 1875
 Hylastes parvus Blackman, 1941
 Hylastes peregrinus Chapuis, 1869
 Hylastes piceae Pfeffer, 1944b
 Hylastes pinicola Bedel, 1888b
 Hylastes planirostris Chapuis, 1869
 Hylastes plumbeus Blandford, 1894d
 Hylastes porculus Erichson, 1836
 Hylastes porosus LeConte, 1868
 Hylastes pumilus Mannerheim, 1843
 Hylastes pupillatus Hansen, V. (Eggers in), 1955
 Hylastes pusillus Blackman, 1941
 Hylastes retifer Wood, 1982a
 Hylastes rotundicollis Reitter, 1894a
 Hylastes ruber Swaine, 1915
 Hylastes rufipes Eichhoff, 1868c
 Hylastes salebrosus Eichhoff, 1868
 Hylastes scaber Swaine & J.M., 1917
 Hylastes scabripennis Zimmermann, 1868
 Hylastes scandinavieus Lekander, 1965b
 Hylastes scobinosus Eichhoff, 1868c
 Hylastes septentrionalis Eggers, 1923b
 Hylastes simplex Rey, 1892b
 Hylastes subalpinus Eggers, 1940h
 Hylastes subopacus Blackman, 1941
 Hylastes substriatus Strohmeyer & H
 Hylastes suspectus Bright, 1972d
 Hylastes swainei Eggers, 1934b
 Hylastes techangensis Tsai & Huang, 1964a
 Hylastes tenuis Eichhoff, 1868
 Hylastes variegatus Blandford, 1897a
 Hylastes variolosus Perris, 1852
 Hylastes vastans Chapuis, 1869
 Hylastes webbi Blackman, 1941
 Hylastes yukonis Fall, 1926

References

Further reading

External links

 

Scolytinae
Articles created by Qbugbot